Feihyla vittiger is a species of frog in the family Rhacophoridae. It is endemic to West Java, Indonesia, and has been recorded in Mount Halimun Salak National Park and Pangalengan. Common names Indonesian bubble-nest frog and wine-coloured tree bubble-nest frog have been proposed for it.

Habitat and conservation
Females lay their eggs on leaves overhanging ponds and attend to them until the eggs hatch into free-living tadpoles.

Feihyla vittiger can be locally common. It is potentially threatened by habitat loss caused by small-scale farming, provided that the vegetation surrounding ponds in the plantations is completely removed. It is present in a number of small protected areas and in the Mount Halimun Salak National Park.

References

vittiger
Amphibians of Indonesia
Endemic fauna of Java
Taxa named by George Albert Boulenger
Amphibians described in 1897
Taxonomy articles created by Polbot
Taxobox binomials not recognized by IUCN